Rolf Bjørn Backe (21 November 1934 – 11 September 2012)  was a Norwegian footballer, bandy player and business person. He was born in Gjøvik. He became Norwegian cup champion with the club SK Gjøvik-Lyn in 1962, scoring twice in the final. He played 18 matches for the national football team.

References

1934 births
2012 deaths
Sportspeople from Gjøvik
Norwegian footballers
Norway international footballers
Norwegian businesspeople
SK Gjøvik-Lyn players
Association football forwards